A local election  was held in the Mexican state of Nuevo León on Sunday, July 5, 2009, to elect, on the local level:

Governor of Nuevo León
51 municipal presidents (mayors) to serve for a three-year term.
42 local deputies (26 by the first-past-the-post system and 16 by proportional representation) to serve for a three-year term in the Congress of Nuevo León.

Gubernatorial election

External links
Electoral Institute of Nuevo León website

2009 elections in Mexico
2009